Yael Hollenberg, born on March 2, 1969 (Age ) in Thiais, is a French author of educational books.

Biography 
Yael Hollenberg studied at Paris Diderot University. She studied at an exchange program with Columbia University in New York from 1992 to 1994, where she was trained in Jewish liturgy at the Jewish Theological Seminary of America, where she worked as a librarian. During this time, she volunteered at the magazine Tikkun with Rabbi Michael Lerner. From 1995 to 1999, she worked at MJLF as a teacher. Since 2002, she has taught at Adath Shalom, particularly focusing on Bar-Mitsvah training. She also trained in singing in New York and at the conservatory of Saint-Mandé. She officiated for the High Holy Days in the Reform Jewish communities of Strasbourg and Grenoble, and then in Adath Shalom from 2004 on.

Yael Hollenberg is the author of several educational works on Jews and Judaism, used especially in Talmud and Torah schools. She is also the freelance author of multimedia resources for the company Tralalère, and is in this capacity the author of educational resources for their e-talmud site.

From 2009 to 2015, she presided over the ANPEIP Île de France. She is the mother of two children.

Works 
 Célébrons les Fêtes Juives, volumes 1 and 2, Biblieurope, 2004
 Tefilati, an introduction to prayer for children, Biblieurope, 2004
 Comprendre la Torah, Biblieurope, 2005
 Comprendre les Prophètes - Neviim, Biblieurope, 2006
 Tiyoul be-Israel, manuel d'hébreu, a collaboration with Shifra Svironi and Michal Svironi, Biblieurope, 2006
 Les Fêtes Juives, Biblieurope, 2008
 Joyeuses Fêtes !, Biblieurope, 2008
 Histoire du Peuple Juif, Biblieurope, 2009
 Mon encyclopédie du judaïsme, Biblieurope, 2015

References

External links 

  e-talmud site

People from Thiais
1969 births
20th-century French Jews
Jewish French writers
Living people